Qara Nuru (known as Krasnoselsk until 1992) is a village and the most populous municipality, except for the capital Saatlı, in the Saatly Rayon of Azerbaijan.  It has a population of 5,737.

References

External links

Qara Nuru